Igor Volkov (born January 24, 1983) is a Russian professional ice hockey player. He is currently an unrestricted free agent who most recently played with Toros Neftekamsk of the Supreme Hockey League (VHL).

Volkov made his Kontinental Hockey League (KHL) debut playing with Avangard Omsk during the 2008–09 KHL season. After a single season in 2013–14 with HC Spartak Moscow, Volkov signed as a free agent to a one-year contract with CSKA Moscow on May 7, 2014.

Career statistics

References

External links

1983 births
Living people
Avangard Omsk players
HC CSKA Moscow players
HC Dynamo Moscow players
HC Neftekhimik Nizhnekamsk players
Russian ice hockey left wingers
Salavat Yulaev Ufa players
HC Spartak Moscow players
Toros Neftekamsk players
HC Yugra players
New York Islanders draft picks
Sportspeople from Ufa